Trendz... is the debut studio album by American hip hop group Trends of Culture, released in April 20, 1993 by Mad Sounds Recordings. It was produced by the group, with co-production by Dinky and Swift.

Critical reception
The Tampa Bay Times praised the album, writing that it "blends an old school vibe with modern rhymes and cutting-edge production, jazzy yet hard core."

Track listing

"F@#% What Ya Heard" – 4:11
"Let tha Big Boyz Play" – 4:28 
"Old Habits" – 4:46
"Who Got My Back?" – 3:14
"Hassle on the Iron Horse" – 5:00
"Off & On" – 4:23
"Crotch Ripper/Mad Speaker" – 4:06
"Mad Flavor Mad Style" – 3:26
"Valley of the Skinz" – 5:07
"Top Ten Interlude" – 2:44
"Valley of the Skinz" (Bonus Mix) – 5:40

Singles chart positions

References

External links
 

1993 debut albums